Mark Samuel Nelkin (born 12 May 1931) is a theoretical physicist at the Cornell University.

Under the direction of Professor Hans Bethe, he received his Ph.D. in theoretical physics from Cornell in 1955. From 1955 to 1962 he worked in the nuclear industry for General Electric in Schenectady and General Atomic in San Diego. In 1962 he became a member of the Cornell faculty. He was awarded a Guggenheim Fellowship in 1968. He retired from Cornell University as professor emeritus in 1993. After retirement he moved to New York City and remained active in refereeing articles for Physical Review Letters, Physical Review E, The Physics of Fluids, and the Journal of Fluid Mechanics.

Nelkin became a Fellow of the American Physical Society in 1984, having been nominated by their Division of Fluid Dynamics, for contributions to the advancement of physics by strong theoretical contributions in four areas beginning with the physics of thermal neutrons and its applications to nuclear reactors, kinetic theory of fluctuations in fluids, turbulence, and 1/f noise.

Nelkin was married to American sociologist of science Dorothy Nelkin until her death in 2003.

Publications
 Does Kolmogorov mean field theory become exact for turbulence above some critical dimension?

References

External links
 Mark Nelkin at ResearchGate

Living people
1931 births
Cornell University alumni
21st-century American physicists
Theoretical physicists
Cornell University faculty
Fellows of the American Physical Society